On September 5, 2002, during the Second Intifada, a Merkava II tank was driving along a dirt road near the Kissufim crossing following figures identified as "suspicious" when it was blown up by a 100-kilogram bomb buried under the road. Sgt. Aviad Dotan (21) of Nir Galim was killed instantly; three soldiers were wounded. It took five hours to extricate the surviving soldiers from the burning tank.

The tank commander was blown out of the turret hatch but landed unharmed.  It was the third deadly Palestinian assault on an Israeli tank in 2002.

According to the Israel Defense Forces, the incident began on the previous night, when anti-tank missiles were fired at an army post. Soldiers and the tank were sent to search for the rocket launchers, and militants detonated the bomb under the tank.

An Arab umbrella group dominated by Yasser Arafat's Fatah organization claimed responsibility, stating, "This operation came to prove that Palestinian fighters are capable of reaching everywhere.

Response
Israel responded to the ambush by launching a helicopter missile strike at a metal workshop or foundry being used as a bomb factory in Khan Younis.  The bomb-making factory was empty when it was targeted, there were no casualties.

Israel's defense minister, Binyamin Ben-Eliezer reacted at a meeting of his Labor Party by stating that  Israel would not return occupied areas of the Gaza Strip to the control of the  Palestinian Authority, as it had pledged to do the previous month.

Israeli fatalities
 Sgt. Aviad Dotan, 21, of Moshav Nir Galim

References

External links 

Gaza–Israel conflict
2002 in the Palestinian territories
2002 in the Gaza Strip
September 2002 events in Asia
Military operations of the Israeli–Palestinian conflict